Mickey D. Barnett, an attorney and state senator from New Mexico was a Governor of the United States Postal Service, appointed by President George W. Bush on August 17, 2006, for a term that expired on December 8, 2013. Barnett served one term as Republican National Committeeman from New Mexico before being defeated for re-election.

Barnett served the public in the New Mexico State Senate from 1980 to 1984. Previously he served the federal government as a legislative assistant to Senator Pete Domenici (1972–1976).

Barnett is a graduate of Eastern New Mexico University, receiving a Bachelor of Arts degree in business administration. He received his J.D. degree from George Washington University National Law Center in 1977.

References

Living people
New Mexico lawyers
Republican Party New Mexico state senators
Eastern New Mexico University alumni
United States Postal Service people
Year of birth missing (living people)